Zaccanopoli is a comune of the province of Vibo Valentia, it possesses around 900 inhabitants.

confinements: Briatico, Drapia, Parghelia, Zambrone, Zungri.

Evoluzione Demografica

References

Cities and towns in Calabria